The Mnierea is a left tributary of the river Crișul Repede in Romania. It discharges into the Crișul Repede near Aștileu.

References

 Doua vai din Muntii Padurea Craiului:Mniera si Poiana 

Rivers of Romania
Rivers of Bihor County